Manse can refer to:
Manse, a minister's house, usually used in the context of certain Christian traditions
The Old Manse, a historic house in Massachusetts famous for its American literary associations
Manse, Nevada, a ghost town
Manse,  a nickname for the city of Tampere, Finland, named after being called the Manchester of Finland
Manse, the Korean term for ten thousand years
The Manse Demonstrations, another name for the March 1st Movement
Mansus or manse, unit of land assessment in medieval France
Manse (DJ), Swedish DJ, born Michael Hansen

See also
 The Manse (disambiguation)
 Mosses from an Old Manse, a short story collection by Nathaniel Hawthorne
 MAN SE